Milinovo is a rural locality (a selo) in Novoselskoye Rural Settlement, Kovrovsky District, Vladimir Oblast, Russia. The population was 21 as of 2010. There are 2 streets.

Geography 
Milinovo is located 53 km south of Kovrov (the district's administrative centre) by road. Vasilyevo is the nearest rural locality.

References 

Rural localities in Kovrovsky District
Sudogodsky Uyezd